G. Sudhakaran (born 1 November 1950) is an Indian politician. He is former Minister for Public Works in the Pinarayi Vijayan ministry of the Kerala Legislative Assembly. He belongs to the Communist Party of India (Marxist) and represented the Ambalappuzha constituency from 2006 till 2021.

Career

Politician 

He is Member, CPI (M), Alappuzha District Committee and State Committee. He was elected to Kerala Legislative Assembly in 1996 and 2006.

Author 
He published books including:

Aaranu née Obama (Collection of Poems).
Unni Makane Manohara (Collection of Poems).
Sannithanathile Kazhuthakal (Collection of Poems).
Kanal Vazhiyil Kari Puralathe (Collection of Selected Niyamasabha Speeches).

References

Communist Party of India (Marxist) politicians from Kerala
Malayali politicians
Living people
1950 births
People from Alappuzha district
Kerala MLAs 1996–2001
Kerala MLAs 2011–2016
Kerala MLAs 2016–2021
Government Law College, Thiruvananthapuram alumni